The Balcony Movie (Polish: Film balkonowy) is a 2021 Polish documentary film written, directed and filmed by Pawel Lozinski. The film is composed from the conversations that the director has with the people who pass by on the street below his apartment in Warsaw, each story is unique and deals with the way we try to face life as individuals.

Production 
Powel Łoziński spent more than two years (starting before the pandemic, in 2018) filming the many men and women of all ages in Warsaw, Poland. Almost 2,000 people passed under the balcony during filming that lasted 165 days in 2 years.

Release 
It premiered on August 7, 2021 at the Semaine de la critique at the Locarno Film Festival. The film was released on April 8, 2022 in Polish theaters, and was later released on HBO Max on April 17, 2022.

Awards 
The film was shortlisted by Poland's Polski Instytut Sztuki Filmowej to represent Poland in the Best International Feature Film category at the 95th Academy Awards, but the film was not selected.

References

External links 

 

2021 films
2021 documentary films
Polish documentary films
2020s Polish-language films
2020s English-language films
2020s Russian-language films
Films set in Warsaw
Films shot in Warsaw
Films set in Poland
Films shot in Poland
Films about old age
Films about death